CMIP can refer to:

Common Management Information  Protocol, the OSI specified network management protocol
Coupled Model Intercomparison Project, a collaborative framework designed to improve knowledge of climate change and global warming
Institute for Monitoring Peace and Cultural Tolerance in School Education (formerly Center for Monitoring the Impact of Peace), a non-profit organization that monitors the content of school textbooks